Salina Jebet Kosgei (born 16 November 1976 in Simotwo, Keiyo District) is a long distance runner from Kenya. She is a Commonwealth Games gold medalist, has competed at the Olympics and has won various marathons, including the 2009 Boston Marathon.

Career 

She began her athletics career while at Simotwo Primary School. She moved on to Kapkenda Girls High School and won several national high school titles in heptathlon, 800 metres and 200 metres. She graduated in 1993 and was subsequently recruited by the Kenya Prisons Service.

She competed at the 1994 Commonwealth Games, finishing fifth over 800 metres. After giving birth to her first child in 1996, she decided to try longer distances.

Kosgei won women's 10,000 metres race at the 2002 Commonwealth Games. Her time, 31:27.83, was a new Commonwealth Games Record (still in force after the 2010 Games).

She competed at the 2003 IAAF World Half Marathon Championships in Vilamoura, Spain, but did not finish better than 41st. Kosgei competed for Kenya at the 2008 Summer Olympics in marathon, finishing tenth.

On 20 April she won the 2009 Boston Marathon timing 2:32:16, a second ahead of Dire Tune of Ethiopia. She attempted to defend her title the following year's race but the honours went to Teyba Erkesso while Kosgei finished in third place. She had two other marathon races in 2009, coming third at the Grottazzolina Marathon and 15th at the 2010 New York City Marathon. She also won the Florence Half Marathon.

In 2011, she was in the top ten at the Lisbon Half Marathon, Portugal Half Marathon and Yokohama Women's Marathon. Her best result that year was a run of 2:32:06 hours for fifth at the San Diego Marathon. She did not compete in 2012 and made only two appearances in 2013, coming fourth at the Stockholm Marathon and winning the Marathon des Alpes-Maritimes.

Personal life 

She is married to hurdler Barnabas Kinyor. They have a son and a daughter, Billy and Ruth, born in 1996 and 2001, respectively.

Achievements

Major international competitions

Road races

References

External links

1976 births
Living people
People from Elgeyo-Marakwet County
Kenyan female middle-distance runners
Kenyan female long-distance runners
Kenyan female marathon runners
Olympic athletes of Kenya
Commonwealth Games gold medallists for Kenya
Athletes (track and field) at the 1994 Commonwealth Games
Athletes (track and field) at the 2002 Commonwealth Games
Athletes (track and field) at the 2008 Summer Olympics
Boston Marathon female winners
Paris Marathon female winners
Commonwealth Games medallists in athletics
Medallists at the 2002 Commonwealth Games